Georges Dagonia (born 9 December 1930 in Guadeloupe; died 29 September 2007) is a politician from Guadeloupe who was elected to the French Senate in 1977.

References 

Guadeloupean politicians
French people of Guadeloupean descent
French Senators of the Fifth Republic
1930 births
2007 deaths
Senators of Guadeloupe